Reuben "River" Reeves (October 25, 1905 in Evansville, Indiana – September 1975 in New York City) was an American jazz trumpeter and bandleader.

Reeves started out playing locally in the Midwest; he moved to New York City in 1924 and then to Chicago in 1925. In 1926 he joined Erskine Tate's orchestra, then played with Fess Williams and Dave Peyton (1928–1930). While in Chicago, he took lessons from a German trumpet player, Albert Cook, who played in the Chicago Symphony. While playing at the Regal Theater in 1929, Peyton featured Reeves, his hot trumpet player, on a night where Louis Armstrong, who had a gig across the street at the Savoy, performed as a guest. The "vicious" gesture from Peyton in an attempt to intimidate Armstrong did not work as the audience begged Armstrong to play five encores. He signed to Vocalion and recorded as a bandleader with his groups the Tributaries and the River Boys; among his sidemen were his brother, trombonist Gerald Reeves, and clarinetist Omer Simeon (20 sides were recorded in 1929). He played under Cab Calloway in 1931-32, and recorded again with the River Boys in 1933. He toured as a leader from 1933–35, then played freelance through the late 1930s. During World War II, he led an Army band called the Jungleers. Stationed at the Army Jungle Training Center on the northeast coast of Oahu, they were popular participants in Battle of the Band competitions that were an integral part of the "extraordinary music scene in Hawaii during the war."   After the war, he played in Harry Dial's Blusicians in 1946.

Reeves' entire output as a bandleader has been released to a single compact disc by RST Records.

References

Scott Yanow, [ Reuben Reeves] at Allmusic

1905 births
1975 deaths
American jazz trumpeters
American male trumpeters
American jazz bandleaders
Musicians from Indiana
20th-century American musicians
20th-century trumpeters
20th-century American male musicians
American male jazz musicians
The Cab Calloway Orchestra members